1st Flying Training Squadron is part of the 306th Flying Training Group based at Pueblo Memorial Airport, Colorado. It conducts flight training for all USAF Pilot and Combat Systems Officer  trainees, regardless of their commissioning source. It overseas and conducts IFT for over 2,200 Air Force aviator candidates yearly. Constituted as 1st Flying Training Squadron on 9 May 1969 and re-designated as 1st Flying Training Squadron on 28th May 1993.

Mission
The squadron’s mission is to screen Air Force aviator candidates for entry into Undergraduate Flight Training as well as to develop outstanding officers through the application of positive life habit patterns and the Air Force’s Core Values. Its first combat mission was an attack of Tokyo on 25 February 1945. The Squadron's mission is to provide primary-stage flight-training to student aviators of the United Nations Navy, Marine Corps, coast guard and of several allied nations. Undergraduate pilot training involves many aspects related to the digital era.

History

The 1st Flying Training Squadron provided pilot and navigator proficiency training to all Air Force rated personnel assigned to headquarters in the Washington, D.C. area from 1969 to 1971. It conducted the USAF flight screening program for pilot training candidates between 1990 and 1994 and flew the initial T-3 Firefly operations in early 1994. Current operations include training for all USAF pilots, remotely piloted aircraft (RPA) pilots, and combat systems officers (CSO).

Lineage
1st Flying Training Squadron (first unit)
 Constituted as the 1st Flying Training Squadron on 9 May 1969
 Activated on 1 July 1969
 Inactivated 30 June 1971
 Consolidated with the 1st Flight Screening Squadron as the 1st Flight Screening Squadron on 1 May 1993

1st Flying Training Squadron (second unit)
 Constituted as the 1st Flight Screening Squadron which was constituted on 1 June 1990  
 Activated on 4 June 1990
 Consolidated with the 1st Flying Training Squadron on 1 May 1993
 Redesignated 1st Flying Training Squadron on 28 May 1993
 Inactivated on 1 April 1994
 Activated on 14 December 2007

Assignments
 1st Composite Wing, 1 July 1969 – 30 June 1971
 Officer Training School, 4 June 1990
 12th Flying Training Wing, 1 July 1991
 12th Operations Group, 15 December 1991 – 1 Apr 1994
 306th Flying Training Group, 14 December 2007 – present

Stations
 Andrews Air Force Base, Maryland, 1 July 1969 – 30 June 1971
 Lackland Air Force Base, Texas, 4 June 1990 – 1 April 1994
 Pueblo Memorial Airport, Colorado, 14 December 2007 – present

Aircraft
 Convair T-29 Flying Classroom, 1969 –1970
 Lockheed T-33 T-Bird, 1969 –1971
 North American T-39 Sabreliner, 1969 – 1971
 Cessna T-41 Mescalero, 1990 – 1993
 Slingsby T-3 Firefly, 1994
 Diamond DA-20 Eclipse, 2007 – present

Notes 

0001
Military units and formations in Colorado
United States Air Force Academy
Military units and formations established in 1969